Richard Hans Olivares Lopez (born 4 September 1978) is a Chilean former footballer who played as a forward.

Club career
He played for Deportes Antofagasta and other clubs in his country and Mexico.

Coaching career
In June 2021, Olivares assumed as the head coach of Deportes Antofagasta (women) after Luciano Poggi was released. Previously he was the assistant coach. He left the charge at the beginning of 2022.

Personal life
He is the younger brother of Cristian Olivares, who also played for Deportes Antofagasta, Magallanes, Coquimbo Unido and Deportes Temuco.

He is nicknamed Corazón Valiente (Brave Heart), since he has a pacemaker due to a heart defect detected while he was a player of Deportes Antofagasta in 2008.

Honours

Player
Deportes Antofagasta
 Primera B de Chile (1): 2011 Apertura

References

External links
 
 
 Richard Olivares at playmakerstats.com (English version of ceroacero.es)

1978 births
Living people
People from Antofagasta
Chilean footballers
Chilean expatriate footballers
Deportes Magallanes footballers
Magallanes footballers
Deportes Temuco footballers
Unión Española footballers
Club América footballers
San Luis F.C. players
Lobos BUAP footballers
C.D. Antofagasta footballers
Coquimbo Unido footballers
Deportes Colchagua footballers
Chilean Primera División players
Liga MX players
Ascenso MX players
Primera B de Chile players
Segunda División Profesional de Chile players
Chilean expatriate sportspeople in Mexico
Expatriate footballers in Mexico
Association football forwards
Chilean football managers